Funadhoo as a place name may refer to:
 Funadhoo (Baa Atoll) (Republic of Maldives)
 Funadhoo (Kaafu Atoll) (Republic of Maldives)
 Funadhoo (Shaviyani Atoll) (Republic of Maldives)
 Funadhoo Airport